Daniel T. McNeill (July 19, 1947 – September 8, 2017) was a Democratic member of the Pennsylvania House of Representatives, first elected in 2012. He represented the 133rd district. From 1966 to 1972, McNeill was a member of the Pennsylvania National Guard. McNeill has also served as a commissioner and executive for Whitehall Township, and as Manager of Regional Partnerships for Lehigh County.

McNeill died in Bethlehem, Pennsylvania on September 8, 2017 at the age of 70.

References

External links
Official page at the Pennsylvania General Assembly
 

1947 births
2017 deaths
Politicians from Allentown, Pennsylvania
Military personnel from Pennsylvania
Democratic Party members of the Pennsylvania House of Representatives
21st-century American politicians